Westcoast, as one word, is used by the following:

Westcoast Aftershocc, and album by American hip hop duo Tha Dogg Pound
Westcoast Air, a Canadian airline
Westcoast Curling Classic, an annual curling tournament held on Thanksgiving weekend in New Westminster, British Columbia
Westcoast klipfish, the South African name for the Clinus heterodon, a species of clinid, a marine fish
Westcoaster Mailster, a small three-wheeled vehicle used for mail delivery in the United States during the 1950s and 60s
Westcoast Limited, UK and Ireland IT distributor
Westcoast Pipeline, a natural gas pipeline in British Columbia built by Westcoast Transmission Co., later renamed Westcoast Energy, and bought since by Duke Energy of Charlotte, North Carolina
Westcoast Songwriter's Conference, an annual conference hosted by the Westcoast Songwriter's organization, a nonprofit educational organization founded in 1979

See also
West Coast (disambiguation)